In mathematics, the Dottie number is a constant that is the unique real root of the equation

,

This implies that the equation  has only one real solution. It is the single real-valued fixed point of the cosine function and is a nontrivial example of a universal attracting fixed point. It is also a transcendental number because of the Lindemann-Weierstrass theorem. The generalised case  for a complex variable  has infinitely many roots, but unlike the Dottie number, they are not attracting fixed points.

The name of the constant originates from a professor of French named Dottie who observed the number by repeatedly pressing the cosine button on her calculator.

Closed form

The Dottie number can be expressed as

where  is the inverse regularized Beta function. Particularly, in Microsoft Excel and LibreOffice Calc spreadsheets as SQRT(1-(2*BETA.INV(1/2,1/2,3/2)-1)^2), in Mathematica computer algebra system as Sqrt[1 - (2 InverseBetaRegularized[1/2, 1/2, 3/2] - 1)^2].

Notes

References

Mathematical constants
Real transcendental numbers
Fixed points (mathematics)

External links